Cambridge-Narrows is an unincorporated community in Queens County, New Brunswick, Canada. It held village status prior to 2023.

The village straddled Washedemoak Lake, a widening of the Canaan River, several kilometres upstream of the Saint John River.  Cambridge-Narrows has 3 main arteries, Route 695, Route 715, and Route 710

History

The Cambridge-Narrows consisted of two separate settlements on either side of the river, Cambridge and The Narrows, which were merged under one municipal government in 1966.

On 1 January 2023, Cambridge-Narrows amalgamated with the village of Gagetown and all or part of five local service districts to form the new village of Arcadia. The community's name remains in official use.

Demographics 

Notable people

Bordering communities
Hampton
Big Cove
McDonald Corner
Jemseg
Hatfield Point
Springfield, Kings County

References

External links
 Village of Cambridge Narrows

Communities in Queens County, New Brunswick
Former villages in New Brunswick